Sergey Galdunts (born January 17, 1965) is an Armenian chess Grandmaster (2003). He won the Armenian Chess Championship in 1991 and played for Armenia-3 in the 32nd Chess Olympiad.

Achievements
1994: Second at Wiesbaden Open
1999: Won the Bischwiller-A tournament
2000: Second at Gold Coast Parkroyal Open

References

External links
 
 
 Sergey Galdunts chess games - 365Chess.com

1965 births
Living people
Sportspeople from Baku
Chess grandmasters
Armenian chess players
Chess Olympiad competitors
Soviet Armenians